Richard Engels was a Democratic member of the South Dakota House of Representatives. He represented the 9th district from 2003 to 2004, and again from 2007 to 2010. Engels was a Legislative Research Council Executive Board member in 2007–2008.

References

External links
Project Vote Smart - Representative Richard A. Engels (SD) profile

Democratic Party members of the South Dakota House of Representatives
1969 births
Living people
People from Hartford, South Dakota